Xeer (pronounced ) is the traditional legal system of Somalia, Somaliland, Djibouti, Somali Region, and the North Eastern Province in Kenya. One of the three systems from which formal Somali law draws its inspiration, the others being civil law and Islamic law. It is believed to pre-date Islam, although it was influenced by Islam and retains the faith elements, the proceeding under rule pre-date Islam. Under this system, elders, known as the  serve as mediator judges and help settle court cases, taking precedent and custom into account. Xeer is polycentric in that different groups within Somali society have different interpretations of xeer.

Application of xeer 
Somali society is traditionally structured around a patriarchal clan based system, subdivided into sub-clans, then lineages, and finally mag groupings. These groups are bound together either by family ties or contract. Xeer justice usually revolves around the latter groups, as these are the smallest. In these groups, each member is responsible for the crimes of another, and must accordingly bear some fraction of any decided punishment. Within this system, only the victim or immediate family of a victim can bring criminal proceedings to xeer mediation. If the victim is a man, his father, brothers, or uncles can bring complaints forward. If the victim is a woman, complaints can be brought forward by the men in her family or the men in her husband's family.

In xeer, crimes are defined in terms of being transgressions against property rights. Justice is directed in the form of material compensation to the victim. If the accused is found guilty, some form of material restitution must be paid. If restitution cannot be given, mag retribution is due, measured in terms of livestock (usually healthy female camels), to be paid to the victim or the victim's family. There is no concept of imprisonment under xeer. In some cases, elders may advise that neither side seeks restitution or retribution. The verdict is enforced by the victim's family or else by all able-bodied clansmen within the area wherein the verdict is to be executed.

Xeer judges are made up of the heads of extended families. These family heads are chosen for their knowledge of law and wisdom, but otherwise there is no formal training, and each judge is allowed to formulate their own doctrines and legal principles. Multiple judges are chosen to preside over each case by the involved parties, with this delegation being called an "ergo". The number of judges involved in a case is usually around ten, though it can be as few as two.

In each case, the goal is to reach consensus between the parties. Arbitration traditionally takes place under a large tree, and the mediators ask each of the parties to submit to the ruling of the judges. In modern times, meeting halls are often used as opposed to sitting under a tree. Each party has the right to appoint a representative to speak on its behalf, while a recorder loudly repeats any important points that are made. If a fact is disputed, its veracity must be obtained by the testimony of three witnesses. If this cannot be done, an oath must be sworn. Should proceedings become heated, the presiding judge may order a recess, wherein both parties discuss issues relating to the case in small informal groups. Once the mediation has been decided, an appeal may be requested, although this must be agreed to by all parties.

Principles of xeer 
Different groups within Somali society undertake oral agreements with each other to define xeer law. Despite this informal nature, there is a series of generally accepted principles, agreements, and ideas that constitute xeer, referred to collectively as "xissi adkaaday". These are:

the payment of mag by the collective group (clan, sub-clan, lineage, or mag group) from which an offender originates as compensation for the crimes of murder, bodily assault, theft, rape, and defamation of character, given to the victim or victim's family;
the protection of vulnerable or respected members of society such as the elderly, women, children, poets, guests and religious people 
obligations to the family such as the payment of a dowry to a bride 
the rights of a widower to marry the dead wife's sister and the inheritance of a widow by the dead man's brother 
the punishments for elopement 
and the division and use of natural resources like water and land.

See also
 Adat (Malays of Nusantara)
 Anglo-Saxon law (England)
 Gadaa (Oromo)
 Aqsaqal (Central Asia)
 Coutume (France)
 Customary Aboriginal law (Australia)
 Early Germanic law
 Early Irish law (Ireland)
 Frith-borh
 Kanun (Albania)
 Kritarchy
 Laws of the Brets and Scots (Scotland)
 Medieval Scandinavian laws
 Pashtunwali and Jirga (Pashtuns of Pakistan and Afghanistan)
 Smriti and Ācāra (India)
 Urf (Arab world/Islamic law)
 Vlach law (Romanians)
 Welsh Law (Wales)

References

Sources

Abdile, Mahdi. 2012. Customary Dispute Resolution in Somalia. African Conflict & Peacebuilding Review, Volume 2, Number 1: 87–110.
Gladitz, Nicola. Somalia: A Tradition of Law
Van Notten, Michael. The Law of the Somalis: A Stable Foundation for Economic Development in the Horn of Africa, 2005.

External links
https://mises.org/library/rule-law-without-state

Law of Somalia
Courts by type
Customary legal systems
Ancient Somalia
Collectivism